Lipinia inexpectata is a species of skink. Prior to its description, it was confused with Lipinia quadrivittata. It is endemic to Borneo and is found in both Indonesian and Malaysian parts of the island.

References

Lipinia
Endemic fauna of Borneo
Reptiles of Indonesia
Reptiles of Malaysia
Reptiles described in 2007
Taxa named by Indraneil Das
Taxa named by Christopher C. Austin
Reptiles of Borneo